Tapio Kalervo Koskinen (born 22 January 1953 in Pori, Finland) is a retired professional ice hockey player who played in the SM-liiga.  He played for Ässät.  He was inducted into the Finnish Hockey Hall of Fame in 1998.

Career statistics

External links
 Finnish Hockey Hall of Fame bio

1953 births
Living people
Ässät players
Finnish ice hockey players
Ice hockey players at the 1976 Winter Olympics
Olympic ice hockey players of Finland
Sportspeople from Pori
Ässät football players